Almami Samori da Silva Moreira (born 16 June 1978) is a Guinea-Bissauan retired footballer who played as a midfielder. He also holds Portuguese citizenship.

After starting out at Boavista he went on to represent mainly Standard Liège and Partizan, also playing professionally in four other countries during his career.

Club career

Boavista
Born in Bissau, Guinea-Bissau, Moreira reached Boavista FC's youth ranks in 1994, but started out professionally with northern neighbours Gondomar S.C. and Gil Vicente FC, on loan.

He returned in 1999 and went on to have relative impact in the first team, being mainly used as a substitute and being part of the squad as the club won the Primeira Liga in his last year, although he did not appear in any matches whatsoever due to a contract dispute.

Belgium / Russia
With the start of the new millennium Moreira moved to Standard Liège, where he quickly became a fan favourite, going on to spend five years in Belgium, a loan to Hamburger SV in 2004–05 notwithstanding.

In August 2006, he joined Russia's FC Dynamo Moscow, a club that was signing a large number of Portuguese and Portugal-based players at the time. Unsettled as the vast majority of those, he returned to his country of adoption in January, as lowly C.D. Aves battled to avoid relegation from the top level, which eventually did not happen.

Partizan
On 5 July 2007, Moreira signed a two-year contract with FK Partizan in Serbia, being handed the #10 shirt whilst also becoming the first Portuguese player to represent the club. Very quickly he became the leading player of the team with which he managed to win two Doubles in a row, which happened for the first time in the history of the club. He made his competitive debut on 19 July in a match against HŠK Zrinjski Mostar, and scored his first official goal on 2 August in a UEFA Cup fixture against the same club.

On 29 September 2007, Moreira scored against city rivals Red Star in a 2–2 draw – this made him the first ever Portuguese to score in a Belgrade derby. In his first season at the club he appeared 28 times and netted seven times, as Partizan won the league title; to this he added the domestic cup.

In a UEFA Cup match at Sevilla FC, on 3 December 2008, Moreira collapsed early into the game, being immediately taken into observation, and fully recovering. On 10 April 2009 he agreed to sign a new three-year contract, running until 2012.

Following impressive and consistent performances, Moreira was named in the 2008–09 SuperLiga Team of the Year, alongside seven teammates, as the double was again conquered – he was also voted as the club's Player of the Year in 2008 by the fans. On 28 February 2009, he scored the 1–1 equaliser at home against Red Star; on 5 August, grieving the loss of his mother a day earlier, he decided to play in the second leg of his team's UEFA Champions League qualifier against APOEL FC: he scored the opener in the third minute, but the Cypriots eventually progressed 2–1 on aggregate.

On 27 February 2010, Moreira made his 100th competitive match for Partizan, coming on as a 55th-minute substitute for Saša Ilić against FK Borac Čačak. He missed several games at the beginning of the following campaign due to injury, returning to action on 15 October in a 5–3 home league victory over FK Smederevo where he provided two assists. Four days later he made his Champions League debut, in a 0–2 group stage away loss to S.C. Braga; late in the same month, he scored the only goal at Red Star for the domestic league.

Later years
Moreira split the following years with Dalian Aerbin F.C. in China and another team in Serbia, FK Vojvodina. In late 2012 the 34-year-old moved clubs and countries again, joining Spain's UD Salamanca.

Moreira retired in 2013 at the age of 35, being named Atlético Clube de Portugal's director of football. He came out of retirement in January of the following year, after being convinced by newly appointed coach Neca.

International career
Moreira played for Portugal under-21s on 12 occasions in the late 1990s, and in 2002 he was part of the national B-team that won the Vale do Tejo summer tournament.

In 2010, with the increasing development and professionalization of football in Guinea-Bissau, he decided to represent the land of his ancestors at full level, earning his first cap in October of that year at the age of 32.

Personal life
His son Diego is also a professional footballer.

Career statistics

Club

Honours

Club
Partizan
Serbian SuperLiga: 2007–08, 2008–09, 2009–10, 2010–11
Serbian Cup: 2007–08, 2008–09, 2010–11

Dalian Aerbin
China League One: 2011

Individual
Man of the Season – Most regular Standard player of the season (through voting in official website): 2001–02; Runner-up 2002–03, 2003–04; Third 2005–06
Trophy Scharlaken UGH – Standard player of the season (presented by Les Rouches de Flandres fanclub in cooperation with the official website): 2001–02, 2002–03
Serbian SuperLiga Team of the Season: 2008–09, 2009–10
Partizan Player of the Year: 2008

References

External links

1978 births
Living people
Sportspeople from Bissau
Bissau-Guinean footballers
Portuguese footballers
Association football midfielders
Primeira Liga players
Liga Portugal 2 players
Segunda Divisão players
Boavista F.C. players
Gondomar S.C. players
Gil Vicente F.C. players
C.D. Aves players
Atlético Clube de Portugal players
Belgian Pro League players
Standard Liège players
Bundesliga players
Hamburger SV players
Russian Premier League players
FC Dynamo Moscow players
Serbian SuperLiga players
FK Partizan players
FK Vojvodina players
China League One players
Dalian Professional F.C. players
Segunda División B players
UD Salamanca players
Portugal youth international footballers
Portugal under-21 international footballers
Guinea-Bissau international footballers
Bissau-Guinean expatriate footballers
Portuguese expatriate footballers
Expatriate footballers in Belgium
Expatriate footballers in Germany
Expatriate footballers in Russia
Expatriate footballers in Serbia
Expatriate footballers in China
Expatriate footballers in Spain
Bissau-Guinean emigrants to Portugal
Bissau-Guinean expatriate sportspeople in Belgium
Bissau-Guinean expatriate sportspeople in Germany
Bissau-Guinean expatriate sportspeople in Russia
Bissau-Guinean expatriate sportspeople in Serbia
Bissau-Guinean expatriate sportspeople in China
Bissau-Guinean expatriate sportspeople in Spain
Portugal B international footballers